Boys' Ranch is a 1946 American film about a fictional ex-professional baseball player, "Dan Walker", who starts a ranch in Texas for neglected and delinquent boys. Promoted by MGM as a successor to its award-winning Boys Town hit of 1938, the film is loosely based on ex-wrestler Cal Farley's Boys Ranch near Amarillo, Texas. The film was shot on location near Amarillo.

Plot
Dan Walker, having retired from professional baseball, is concerned about the plight of neglected youth in his Texas town and persuades a group of community leaders to start a livestock ranch as a resident facility for troubled and neglected boys, to develop good character and self-reliance in a wholesome outdoor environment. The men urge Walker to run the ranch and wealthy landowner Davis Banton agrees to permit use of a portion of his property to set up the ranch on a provisional basis.

Two of the boys, "Hank" and "Skippy", are the main protagonists. Hank is sincere and good-hearted, but repeatedly clashes with a cynical and devious Skippy, who mocks Hank as a "trusty". Skippy's misbehavior and thievery eventually cause the neighboring townspeople to call for the ranch's closing. The ongoing conflict between the two boys culminates in a fight in a cemetery when Hank tries to prevent Skippy from running away during a heavy rainstorm. Hank is rendered unconscious when he is knocked backwards and hits his head on a gravestone.

Later, after he learns that Hank never returned to the ranch and is missing, Skippy returns to the scene of the fight and discovers the still-unconscious Hank perilously close to drowning in the rising floodwaters. Braving the raging torrent of water, Skippy rescues Hank. Remorseful that his misbehavior has caused so much harm and nearly cost Hank his life, Skippy tearfully confesses to the thefts and returns the stolen items, his reform complete.

Cast
 James Craig as Dan Walker
 Dorothy Patrick as Susan Walker
 Ray Collins as Davis Banton
 Skip Homeier as Skippy
 Darryl Hickman as Hank
 Jackie "Butch" Jenkins as Butch
 Sharon McManus as Mary Walker
 Minor Watson as Mr. Harper
 Arthur Space as Mr. O'Neill
 Robert Emmett O'Connor as Druggist
 Moroni Olsen as Judge Henderson

Reception
The comedic element added by Jackie Jenkins as "Butch" was praised by Variety, which said his "every appearance is a guaranteed chuckle". According to MGM records, the movie earned $1,124,000 in the US and Canada and $378,000 elsewhere, for total revenue of $1,502,000. Boys' Ranch occasionally airs on Turner Classic Movies.

References

External links

Boys' Ranch at TCMDB

1946 films
1946 drama films
American black-and-white films
American drama films
Films directed by Roy Rowland
Films set in Texas
Metro-Goldwyn-Mayer films
Films with screenplays by William Ludwig
Films scored by Nathaniel Shilkret
1940s English-language films
1940s American films